The 2013–14 Slovenian Football Cup was the 23rd season of the Slovenian Football Cup, Slovenia's football knockout competition.

Qualified clubs

2012–13 Slovenian PrvaLiga members
Aluminij
Celje
Domžale
Gorica
Koper
Maribor
Olimpija
Rudar Velenje
Triglav Kranj
Mura 05 (did not enter, dissolved following the 2012–13 season)

Qualified through MNZ Regional Cups
MNZ Ljubljana:  Krka, Radomlje
MNZ Maribor: Dravograd, Dobrovce
MNZ Celje: Šmartno 1928, Dravinja
MNZ Koper: Jadran Dekani, Ankaran
MNZ Nova Gorica: Tolmin, Brda
MNZ Murska Sobota: Slatina, Veržej
MNZ Lendava: Odranci, Turnišče
MNZG-Kranj: Šenčur, Bled
MNZ Ptuj: Drava Ptuj, Zavrč

First round
Maribor, Celje, Olimpija, Domžale and Drava Ptuj joined the competition in the second round (round of 16).

Round of 16

Notes

Quarter-finals

First leg

Second leg

Notes

Semi-finals

First leg

Second leg

Final

References
General

Specific

External links
 

Slovenian Football Cup seasons
Cup
Slovenia